Malkhan Singh Bishnoi is an Indian politician. He was an MLA from Luni constituency from Jodhpur Rajasthan.

References 

Living people
Indian National Congress politicians from Rajasthan
Year of birth missing (living people)